The 2021–22 BCHL season was the 60th season of the British Columbia Hockey League (BCHL). The eighteen teams from the Coastal and Interior Conferences played 54 game schedules. The 2021 BCHL Showcase occurred shortly after the start of the season on October 20–24, 2021, in Chilliwack. In April, teams played for the Fred Page Cup, the BCHL championship, won by the Penticton Vees.

This was the first full season to be played since the BCHL left the Canadian Junior Hockey League, and as a result would not play for the Doyle Cup regional championship nor the Centennial Cup national championship.

League changes
Changes to the league alignment and schedule that were originally to take place during the 2020–21 BCHL season came into effect. The Prince George Spruce Kings and Cranbrook Bucks joined the seven teams in the Interior Division to form the Interior Conference and the remaining nine teams from the Mainland and Island divisions were merged into the Coastal Conference. The Board of Governors also approved the use of video review for those teams and rinks that wish to implement it.

Pandemic effects and postponed games
At the start of the season, border restrictions for Canadians heading into the United States were still in effect due to the ongoing COVID-19 pandemic. As a result, four home games for the Wenatchee Wild for the month of October were postponed. When it became apparent that these restrictions would continue, the league created a travel plan to allow the Wild to play games at home in Wenatchee for the season, but cancelled the four home games that were initially postponed. Because the league schedule was uneven at the time, it was decided that regular season results would be determined by points percentage rather than total points. In January, a wave of infections caused by the Omicron variant caused half of the teams in the league to be placed into COVID protocol, resulting in several games being postponed.

In mid-November 2021, a heavy storm system traveled through the Pacific Northwest causing severe flooding in the region. On November 30, the BCHL cancelled all remaining inter-conference games as a result of damage sustained to the province's highway system during the flooding and mudslides in the Fraser Valley. The cancelled games were rescheduled featuring teams within the same conference with some previously postponed games to be made up at a later date.

On January 24, 2022, the BCHL announced that the end date of the regular season had been moved from Marth 20 to March 27 in order to make up games missed as a result of the pandemic and from the extreme weather events, with a tentative playoffs start date of April 1. This allowed all teams to play full 54 game schedules.

Standings
Note:  GP = Games Played, W = Wins, L = Losses, OTL = Overtime Losses, Pts = Points

As of March 27, 2022.

x = clinched playoff spot
y = clinched division
z = regular season champion

Post-season

2022 BCHL Fred Page Cup playoffs
Playoff results

Scoring leadersGP = Games Played, G = Goals, A = Assists, P = Points, PIM = Penalties In MinutesLeading goaltendersNote: GP = Games Played, Mins = Minutes Played, W = Wins, L = Losses, OTL = Overtime Losses, GA = Goals Against, SO = Shutouts, Sv% = Save Percentage, GAA = Goals Against Average.''

Award winners
Brett Hull Trophy (Top Scorer): Matthew Wood (Victoria Grizzlies)
Best Defenceman: Tyson Jugnauth (West Kelowna Warriors)
Bruce Allison Memorial Trophy (Rookie of the Year): Matthew Wood (Victoria Grizzlies)
Bob Fenton Trophy (Most Sportsmanlike): Cameron Johnson (Chilliwack Chiefs)
Top Goaltender: Owen Say (Salmon Arm Silverbacks)
Wally Forslund Memorial Trophy (Best Goaltending Duo): Kaeden Lane & Carter Serhyenko (Penticton Vees)
Vern Dye Memorial Trophy (regular-season MVP): Simon Tassy (Salmon Arm Silverbacks
Joe Tennant Memorial Trophy (Coach of the Year): Fred Harbinson (Penticton Vees)
Ron Boileau Memorial Trophy (Best Regular Season Record): Penticton Vees
Cliff McNabb Memorial Trophy (Coastal Conference champions): Nanaimo Clippers
Ryan Hatfield Trophy (Interior Conference champions): Penticton Vees
Fred Page Cup (League Champions): Penticton Vees

Players selected in 2022 NHL Entry Draft
Tyson Jugnauth (West Kelowna Warriors) - Round 4, Pick 100 - Seattle Kraken
Eli Barnett (Victoria Grizzlies) - Round 7, Pick 195 - San Jose Sharks
Tyson Dyck (Cranbrook Bucks) - Round 7, Pick 206 - Ottawa Senators
Abram Wiebe (Chilliwack Chiefs) - Round 7, Pick 209 - Vegas Golden Knights
Cade Littler (Wenatchee Wild) - Round 7, Pick 219 - Calgary Flames

See also
2021 in ice hockey
2022 in ice hockey

References

External links
Official Website of the British Columbia Hockey League

BCHL
British Columbia Hockey League seasons